Small ubiquitin-related modifier 3 is a protein that in humans is encoded by the SUMO3 gene.

Function 

SUMO proteins, such as SUMO3, and ubiquitin (see MIM 191339) posttranslationally modify numerous cellular proteins and affect their metabolism and function. However, unlike ubiquitination, which targets proteins for degradation, sumoylation participates in a number of cellular processes, such as nuclear transport, transcriptional regulation, apoptosis, and protein stability (Su and Li, 2002).[supplied by OMIM]

Interactions 

SUMO3 has been shown to interact with ARNTL and Thymine-DNA glycosylase.

References

Further reading